Playa Hermosa-Punta Mala Wildlife Refuge (Hermosa Beach-Mala Point Wildlife Refuge), is a protected area in Costa Rica, managed under the Central Pacific Conservation Area, it was created in 1998 by decree 27210-MINAE.

References 

Nature reserves in Costa Rica
Protected areas established in 1998